Zoltán Farkas (born November 7, 1963) is a Hungarian politician, member of the National Assembly (MP) for Szeghalom (Békés County Constituency IV) from 2010 to 2014.

He joined Fidesz in 1998. Farkas was a member of the Defence and Internal Security Committee between May 17, 2010 and May 5, 2014.

References

1963 births
Living people
Fidesz politicians
Members of the National Assembly of Hungary (2010–2014)
People from Szeghalom